Madhi is a 2022 Indian Telugu-language romantic drama film written and directed by Naga Dhanush and produced by Ram Kishan for Pragathi Pictures. The film features Sreeram Nimmala, Richa Joshi in lead roles with Sneha Madhuri Sharma, Srikanth Biroju and Yogi Khatri in pivotal roles. The music and background score was composed by P.V.R. Raja.

Plot 

Madhu and Abhi live in the neighboring houses, both of them not belong to the same caste, Madhu's father disapproves of their love and Madhu's marriage is arranged with someone else. Later, abhi unable to stay away from madhu, they meet occasionally, and as Madhu moves away, Abhi gets very sad, and finally Abhi leaves the world.

Cast 
 Sreeram Nimmala as Abhi
 Richa Joshi as Madhu

Soundtrack 

Music composed by P.V.R. Raja

Release
The film was released on 11 November 2022.

References

External links